Fawkner-Whittlesea Blues is a former Australian association football (soccer) club based in Epping, Victoria, a suburb of Melbourne, Victoria. The club was formed towards the end of 2004 from a merger of the senior teams of the Fawkner Blues (founded 1965) and Whittlesea Stallions (founded 2000), and played in the 2005 and 2006 Victorian Premier League seasons. At the end of 2006, Fawkner and Whittlesea dissolved the merger, with Fawkner opting to go back to being a stand-alone club, and Whittlesea forming a partnership with Bulleen to form the Whittlesea Zebras.

Association football clubs established in 2004
Association football clubs disestablished in 2006
Defunct soccer clubs in Australia
Soccer clubs in Melbourne
2004 establishments in Australia
2006 disestablishments in Australia
Italian-Australian culture in Melbourne
Italian-Australian backed sports clubs of Victoria
Sport in the City of Whittlesea